The following television stations operate on virtual channel 5 in Canada:

 CBLT-DT in Toronto, Ontario
 CBXT-DT in Edmonton, Alberta
 CHAU-DT in Carleton, Quebec
 CHAU-DT-2 in Saint-Quentin, New Brunswick
 CHKL-DT in Kelowna, British Columbia
 CIMT-DT-5 in Saint-Urbain, Quebec
 CJCH-DT in Halifax, Nova Scotia
 CKAL-DT in Calgary, Alberta
 CKRT-DT-4 in Cabano, Quebec
 CKRT-DT-6 in Trois-Pistoles, Quebec

05 virtual TV stations in Canada